USS Orleans Parish (LST-1069) was an  in the United States Navy during World War II. Unlike many of her class, which received only numbers and were disposed of after World War II, she survived long enough to be named. On 1 July 1955, all LSTs still in commission were named for US counties or parishes; LST-1069 was given the name Orleans Parish, after Orleans Parish, Louisiana. She was the only U.S. Naval vessel to bear that name.

LST-1069 was laid down on 7 February 1945 at the Bethlehem-Hingham Shipyard of Hingham, Massachusetts; launched on 7 March 1945, sponsored by Mrs. James Whitfield; and commissioned on 31 March 1945.

Service history

World War II, 1946–1946
This new landing ship steamed to Chesapeake Bay for shakedown prior to her departure for the Pacific war zone. Before the end of June LCT sections, transported from New York to the Hawaiian Islands, had been off-loaded and Army troops destined for Leyte, Philippines embarked. Sailing via the Marshall and Mariana Islands, LST-1069 completed this mission and remained in the Philippines until after the Japanese surrender.

With LST Group 37 she proceeded to Shanghai thus becoming one of the first American ships to steam up the Yangtze River since the late 1930s. Here naval personnel were discharged in mid-September to set up an advanced operational base. In October and November Chinese troops were transferred to Formosa for occupation duty from Ningpoo, China and Hai Phong, French Indochina respectively. Four round trips between Tsingtao, China and Sasebo, Japan returned a number of Japanese civilians and soldiers to their home soil by 18 February 1946. After an additional voyage deposited a group of Korean repatriates at Pusan, Korea LST-1069 began to work her way toward the United States.
 
In the Bonin Islands 110 Marines along with some 18 Japanese war criminals and suspects awaited transportation to Guam. A round trip to Saipan followed and then on to Pearl Harbor, where  was taken in tow and delivered on 29 May at San Francisco. Upon resuming her journey she transited the Panama Canal on 5 July, visited Norfolk, unloaded her ammunition in New Jersey and decommissioned at Staten Island, New York on 6 August 1946.

The ship remained in the 3rd Naval District serving the Naval Reserve Training Program until transferred to the Reserve Fleet, Green Cove Springs, Florida in September 1949.

Mine squadron flagship, 1952–1958
The outbreak of Communist aggression in Korea ended her retirement two years later. Recommissioning on 11 January 1952 preceded conversion as a mine squadron flagship and logistic support vessel. Helicopter landing, fueling, and repair facilities also permitted her to embark and control helicopters as demonstrated during 1955 LANTMINEX. Also during 1955, on 1 July, LST–1069 was named USS Orleans Parish (LST-1069), and in December, she made her first Atlantic crossing to take part in an Atlantic Fleet mine evaluation project at Port Lyautey, French Morocco. Her duties as flagship for MinRon 8 were interrupted from 16 December 1957 to 19 December 1958, while the ship was out of commission in reserve at Charleston, South Carolina.

Mine countermeasures support ship, 1959–1966
With additional communications equipment installed and other modifications she rejoined the fleet as the mine countermeasures support ship, USS Orleans Parish (MSC–6). Besides resuming participation in the annual Springboard, MinEx, and PhibEx exercises, on 20 November 1959 she departed Charleston escorting across the Atlantic several recently acquired Norwegian and Spanish minesweepers. After visiting Lisbon, Portugal she returned to her homeport on 4 January 1960. That summer she conducted her first ROTC Midshipmen indoctrination cruise. During February 1963 she paid her first visit to her namesake city at the height of the Mardi Gras festival.

Military Sea Transportation Service, 1966–1970
Orleans Parishs area of operation and assignment changed greatly when she decommissioned on 20 May 1966, and was transferred to the Military Sea Transportation Service (MSTS). Again designated USS Orleans Parish (LST–1069) and altered to serve as a cargo ship, she soon received a civilian crew and 12 September sailed for the Panama Canal and the Pacific. Her first voyage brought her to Guam; Subic Bay, Philippines; Vũng Tàu, South Vietnam; and Yokohama, Japan. She continued to sail in 1970 under the MSTS Far Eastern Command.

Decommissioning and sale
Subsequently, placed out of service, she was struck from the Naval Vessel Register on 30 June 1975. The ship was sold to the Republic of the Philippines on 1 September 1976 to serve as BRP Cotabato Del Norte (LT-511).

References

See also
 List of United States Navy LSTs

LST-542-class tank landing ships
World War II amphibious warfare vessels of the United States
Cold War amphibious warfare vessels of the United States
Cold War mine warfare vessels of the United States
Vietnam War amphibious warfare vessels of the United States
Orleans Parish, Louisiana
Ships built in Hingham, Massachusetts
1945 ships
Ships transferred from the United States Navy to the Philippine Navy
Mine countermeasures support ships of the United States Navy